Ingelise Udjus (9 September 1920 – 5 December 2001) was a Norwegian resistance member, educator and civil servant.

She was born in Drammen and took the cand.mag. degree in 1946, later the pedagogical seminary in 1950. During the Second World War she was active in Milorg from 1941 to 1944 and worked at the Norwegian military mission in Stockholm from 1944 to 1945.

Udjus notably worked as secretary-general in the People's University from 1959 to 1965, head of information at the University of Oslo from 1965 to 1979 and managing director of the Norwegian Museum Council between 1980 and 1990.

Udjus was also a board member of the International Congress of University Adult Education, sat on the Council for Adult Education (1966–1976), the Unesco Commission (1962–1976), the Norwegian-Belgian Cultural Commission and the French-Norwegian Cultural Committee. She was decorated as a Chevalier of the Ordre des Palmes Académiques.

She resided at Jar from 1957, and died in 2001 at Bærum Hospital.

References

1920 births
2001 deaths
People from Drammen
Norwegian resistance members
Female resistance members of World War II
Norwegian expatriates in Sweden
Norwegian educators
Directors of government agencies of Norway
20th-century Norwegian educators